Come Out Fighting Ghengis Smith is English folk / rock singer-songwriter and guitarist Roy Harper's second album and was released in 1968. The album was re-issued in 1977 as The Early Years, re-issued once more on Compact disc in 1991, and was re-released again in December 2017 in both Remastered, 180 Gram Vinyl and CD formats.

History

Columbia Records, recognising Harper's potential, hired American producer Shel Talmy to produce the album. Talmy later claimed that 'Harper was difficult... truculent... we battled. But we got round to it'. The album was orchestrated by Keith Mansfield.

Musically, the album was notable for the 11-minute track "Circle" comprising several movements, "a soundscape of Harper's difficult youth" that, according to Harper, was "totally unlike anything anyone else was doing. The Beatles weren’t doing anything like that at the time. The Stones weren’t doing anything like it, either. No-one was"

Career-wise, the album was notable for establishing a broadening in Harper's musical style away from the more traditional side of contemporary folk music then played. Harper had an interest in traditional folk but did not consider himself a bona fide member of the folk scene. He later explained:-

Harper's record company had different expectations. "They wanted me to write commercial pop songs and when they heard the album... they didn’t have a clue. They wanted hits. And I gave them "Circle"". Bert Jansch contributed sleeve notes for the album. During this period, Harper was managed by American music entrepreneur Jo Lustig; manager of The Pentangle and former agent to Julie Felix.

Single 

The same sessions produced a non-album single (CBS 3371),  "Life Goes By", with "You Don't Need Money" on the B-side. The A-side, also produced by Talmy and orchestrated by Mansfield, has never been reissued.

Re-releases
In 1977 the album was re-issued by CBS with different cover art under the title The Early Years. In 1991 the album was re-released again by Awareness Records with new artwork and additional content. The 2017 remastered album removed those 1991 bonus tracks, reverting to the original 1968 tracklist.

The track "You Don't Need Money" appeared on the first bargain priced sampler album, The Rock Machine Turns You On, as "Nobody's Got Any Money In The Summer".

Track listing

Personnel
Roy Harper – vocals, instruments
 Laurie Allan – additional musician
 Keith Mansfield – additional musician, orchestral arrangements
Technical
Lippa Pearce – design layout
Wayne Millar – photography
 Bert Jansch – liner notes

References 

1968 albums
Roy Harper (singer) albums
Albums produced by Shel Talmy
CBS Records albums
Science Friction albums
Awareness Records albums